Amir Karaoui (born 3 August 1987) is a professional footballer who plays for Al-Washm. He plays primarily as a defensive midfielder. Born in France, he represented Algeria at international level.

Honours
 Algerian Ligue Professionnelle 1: 2011–12, 2012–13
 Algerian Cup: 2011–12

References

External links
 
 

1987 births
Algeria international footballers
Algerian footballers
French footballers
Algerian Ligue Professionnelle 1 players
Saudi Second Division players
ES Sétif players
MC El Eulma players
MC Alger players
Al-Washm Club players
Expatriate footballers in Saudi Arabia
Algerian expatriate sportspeople in Saudi Arabia
French sportspeople of Algerian descent
People from Amnéville
Living people
Association football midfielders
Footballers from Grand Est